Dennis Slamar (born 8 September 1994) is a German footballer who plays as a defender for Energie Cottbus.

Career
Slamar joined the youth academy of Eintracht Braunschweig in 2012 from Hallescher FC. In 2015, he was promoted to the club's senior side in the 2. Bundesliga. However, he made no appearance for the team during the 2015–16 season. In September 2016, Slamar joined Carl Zeiss Jena.

On 24 June 2019 SG Sonnenhof Großaspach confirmed, that they had signed Slamar on a 2-year contract.

References

1994 births
Living people
Footballers from Berlin
German footballers
Association football defenders
Eintracht Braunschweig players
Eintracht Braunschweig II players
FC Carl Zeiss Jena players
SG Sonnenhof Großaspach players
FC Energie Cottbus players
Regionalliga players
3. Liga players